Dom Nicolò Amati (born Nicolò Marchioni or Nicolò Melchioni; 1662–1752) was an Italian violin maker based in Bologna. In 1687 he entered priesthood. He pursued both careers, priesthood and violin-making, throughout his lifetime.

It is assumed that he took the surname "Amati" as a homage to one of the Amatis, the most famous violin-maker family of the time in Bologna, but he was not himself a member.

His violins are considered of varying quality in workmanship, although they are noted for their high-quality varnish.

His workshop was located in the Santi Cosma e Damiano district.

References

18th-century Italian Roman Catholic priests
Italian luthiers
Businesspeople from Bologna
1662 births
1752 deaths
17th-century Italian Roman Catholic priests